Fritz Burgbacher (1 September 1900 – 29 July 1978) was a German politician of the Christian Democratic Union (CDU) and former member of the German Bundestag.

Life 
In 1948 he joined the CDU. There he was state treasurer of the Rhineland regional association from 1952 to 1967 and federal treasurer from 1960 to 1967. He was a member of the German Bundestag from 1957 to 1976, where he initially represented the constituency of Geilenkirchen -Erkelenz - Jülich, later the constituency of Heinsberg. From 27 February 1958 to 19 January 1977, Burgbacher was also a member of the European Parliament, where he was Vice-President from March 1973 to November 1975, having already been Chairman of the Energy Committee there from 1958 to 1967. From 1967 to 1969, he was a member of the North Atlantic Assembly, where he chaired the Economic Committee.

Literature

References

1900 births
1978 deaths
Members of the Bundestag for North Rhine-Westphalia
Members of the Bundestag 1972–1976
Members of the Bundestag 1969–1972
Members of the Bundestag 1965–1969
Members of the Bundestag 1961–1965
Members of the Bundestag 1957–1961
Members of the Bundestag for the Christian Democratic Union of Germany
Christian Democratic Union of Germany MEPs
MEPs for Germany 1958–1979